Dániel Ligeti (born July 31, 1989 in Szombathely) is an amateur Hungarian freestyle wrestler, who competes in the men's super heavyweight category. He won the bronze medal for his division at the 2011 European Wrestling Championships in Dortmund, Germany, and silver at the 2012 European Wrestling Championships in Belgrade, Serbia. Ligeti stands 1.92 metres (6 ft 3.5 in) tall and weighs 115 kilograms (254 lb). He is also currently a member of TuS Adelhausen in Rheinfelden, Baden-Württemberg, Germany, and is coached by Istvan Gulyas from the national wrestling team.

Ligeti represented Hungary at the 2012 Summer Olympics in London, where he competed in the 120 kg class in men's freestyle wrestling. He received a bye for the second preliminary match, before losing out to Belarus' Aleksey Shemarov, who was able to score four points in two straight periods, leaving Ligeti with a single point.

He competed at the 2016 Olympics, beating Florian Temengil to reach the quarter finals where he lost to Levan Berianidze. In March 2021, he competed at the European Qualification Tournament in Budapest, Hungary hoping to qualify for the 2020 Summer Olympics in Tokyo, Japan.

In 2022, he won one of the bronze medals in his event at the Yasar Dogu Tournament held in Istanbul, Turkey. He also won one of the bronze medals in the 125 kg event at the 2022 European Wrestling Championships held in Budapest, Hungary. He competed in the 125kg event at the 2022 World Wrestling Championships held in Belgrade, Serbia.

References

External links
NBC Olympics Profile
 

1989 births
Living people
Olympic wrestlers of Hungary
Wrestlers at the 2012 Summer Olympics
Sportspeople from Szombathely
European Games competitors for Hungary
Wrestlers at the 2015 European Games
Hungarian male sport wrestlers
Wrestlers at the 2016 Summer Olympics
Wrestlers at the 2019 European Games
European Wrestling Championships medalists
21st-century Hungarian people